Niren  may refer to

Niren De, Attorney General of India
Niren Ghosh, Indian politician
Niren Lahiri, Indian film director
Philip Toelkes, also known as Swami Prem Niren
Neil Niren Connery, Full name of Scottish actor Neil Connery